The 2023–24 Ekstraklasa (also known as PKO Ekstraklasa due to sponsorship reasons) will be the 98th season of the Polish Football Championship, the 90th season of the highest tier domestic division in the Polish football league system since its establishment in 1927 and the 16th season of the Ekstraklasa under its current title. The league is operated by the Ekstraklasa S.A.

The regular season is being played as a round-robin tournament. A total of 18 teams participate, 15 of which competed in the league campaign during the previous season, while the remaining three will be promoted from the 2021–22 I liga. The season will start on 14 July 2023 and will conclude on 18 May 2024. Each team will play a total of 34 matches, half at home and half away. It will be the third season in the formula with 18 teams, instead of 16. It is expected that the bottom three teams of the final league table will be relegated. It will be the seventh Ekstraklasa season to use VAR.

Teams
A total of 18 teams will participate in the 2023–24 Ekstraklasa season.

Changes from last season

Stadiums and locations
Note: Table lists in alphabetical order.

League table

See also
2023–24 I liga
2023–24 II liga
2023–24 III liga
2023–24 Polish Cup
2023 Polish Super Cup

References

Ekstraklasa seasons
2023–24 in Polish football
Poland
Scheduled association football competitions